Holy Trinity School (HTS) is a private, co-educational, university preparatory institution located in Richmond Hill, Ontario, and affiliated with the Anglican Church of Canada. There are approximately 740 students currently enrolled from junior kindergarten to grade 12.  HTS is an accredited member of the Canadian Accredited Independent Schools.

History 
HTS was founded in 1981 by members of Holy Trinity Church in Thornhill. The school’s first classrooms were in the church basement. However, enrollment grew quickly; within two years, HTS had relocated to more spacious quarters on Bainbridge Avenue in North York.

The school’s present campus was established on land purchased by the Board of Governors in Richmond Hill. This campus was officially opened in 1985 with the Lieutenant Governor of Ontario, the Honourable Lincoln Alexander, and the Archbishop of Toronto, the Most Reverend L.S. Garnsworthy, in attendance.

During the COVID-19 Pandemic, the school partook in Ontario's rapid testing program. It received over eleven thousand tests, exceeding provincial health advice. It received criticism from school board trustees, and political leaders on the inequitable distribution of pandemic supports to marginalized groups. Critics highlighted the disparity between private institutions, and public schools which did not receive preferential access.

Facilities 
HTS is located at a facility situated on a  campus in Richmond Hill, Ontario. The building underwent a major expansion in 2003 and again in 2016.

The facilities include:
 46 classrooms
 360-seat theatre
 Facilities for art, music and fabrication
 NEW Fitness Centre
 2 innovation labs
 2 libraries
 400-seat Dining Hall
 4 gymnasiums
 3 playing fields
 4 tennis courts
 12-acre woodlot with nature trail
 Innovation Labs

Students at HTS are expected to take part in co-curricular activities.

Lower School
 Mad Science 
 Outdoor Adventure  
 Drama 
 Computers 
 Arts & Crafts   
 Mandarin 
 Peer Tutoring 
 Tennis 
 Ball Hockey  
 Skating  
 Yoga  
 Glee Club  
 Junior Engineering 
 Robotics
 Golf
 Dance

Middle School
 Soccer 
 Volleyball 
 Field Hockey 
 Basketball 
 Cross Country
 Jazz Band  
 Choir 
 Chamber Winds  
 Ball Hockey  
 Skating 
 Robotics  
 Chess    
 Peer Tutoring  
 Drama
 Rugby 
 Softball
 Tennis 
 Track & Field  
 Badminton

Senior School
 Model UN 
 Senior Co-Ed Badminton
 Soccer 
 Volleyball 
 Field Hockey 
 Basketball 
 Cross Country  
 Tennis  
 Tritones Jazz Band
 Ice Hockey  
 Track & Field  
 Ball Hockey  
 Squash 
 Science Olympics   
 Drama
 Rugby 
 Softball    
 Chess Club
School Play

Houses 
Upon enrolment in the school, each student is placed into one of six "houses": Champlain, Bishop Mountain, MacDonald, Thorne, Rose or Langton. Throughout the year, the houses compete in both academic and athletic competitions to earn "house points". At the end of the year, a winner is announced.  House points are earned from specific organized events throughout the year. House points can also be earned by bringing in assorted items to the various food or gift drives that are organized throughout the year or items like old cell phones, batteries and ink cartridges.

Student government 
There are a variety of student government initiatives in the senior school; the two main organizations are the Student Council and the Prefects. The Student Council is a fully elected organization with representatives of the council being elected by students from each homeroom. The purpose of the council is to represent the views of students and to promote and encourage school spirit and community. The Prefects are a team of elected students who are committed to fostering leadership, direction, and spirit in the student body while maintaining a positive environment. They function as an active voice representing the student body and serve as a bridge to the school administration and faculty.

Each year, the Prefect body selects a Head Prefect to lead them throughout the school year. The Head Prefect is responsible for chairing Prefect meetings, organizing all Prefect initiatives within the school, and having an overall pulse on school life. They are widely regarded as the most senior student leader and role model within the HTS community.

Notable alumni 
 Jordan Ullman, one half of the R&B duo Majid Jordan
 Dapo Afolayan, professional footballer who plays as a forward for Oldham Athletic on loan from West Ham United
 Rocco Romeo, professional soccer player who plays as a defender for Danish 1st Division club HB Køge, on loan from Toronto FC in the MLS.

References

High schools in the Regional Municipality of York
Private schools in Ontario
Education in Richmond Hill, Ontario
Anglican schools in Canada
Educational institutions established in 1981
1981 establishments in Ontario